Oscar Bolaño (14 May 1951 – 29 January 2017) was a Colombian footballer. He played in 16 matches for the Colombia national football team from 1975 to 1983. He was also part of Colombia's squad for the 1975 Copa América tournament.

References

External links
 

1951 births
2017 deaths
Colombian footballers
Colombia international footballers
Place of birth missing
Association football defenders
Unión Magdalena footballers
Independiente Santa Fe footballers
Atlético Junior footballers